Prayoon Yomyiam (30 August 1933 – 20 November 2010) was a Thai folk singer, best known for her expertise in the traditional genre of , for which she headed the performing troupe Lamtad Mae Prayoon. She was named National Artist in performing arts (Thai performing arts) in 1994.

In 2018 on her birthday, she was honored with a Google Doodle.

References 

Prayoon Yomyiam
Prayoon Yomyiam
Prayoon Yomyiam
1933 births
2010 deaths